Gwalior Rural Assembly constituency is one of the 230 Vidhan Sabha (Legislative Assembly) constituencies of Madhya Pradesh state in central India. This constituency came into existence in 2008, following the delimitation of the legislative assembly constituencies. It covers part of the erstwhile Morar constituency, which was abolished in 2008.

Overview
Gwalior Rural (constituency number 14) is one of the 6 Vidhan Sabha constituencies located in Gwalior district. This constituency covers Morar Cantonment and part of Gwalior tehsil of the district.

Gwalior Rural is part of Gwalior Lok Sabha constituency along with seven other Vidhan Sabha segments, namely, Gwalior, Gwalior East, Gwalior South, Bhitarwar and Dabra in this district and Karera and Pohari in Shivpuri district.

Members of Legislative Assembly
 2008 Madan Kushwah (BSP) 
 2013 Bharat Singh Kushwah (BJP)

See also
 Morar Cantonment

References

Gwalior district
Assembly constituencies of Madhya Pradesh